Vera Sheehan is a camogie player, winner of a Lynchpin award, predecessor of the All Star awards, in 2003.

Career
She won club championship medals with Granagh-Ballingarry in 1999, 2000 and 2003. 
In 1997 she captained St Mary's Charleville to the secondary schools All Ireland championship. In 2003, she featured on the RTÉ programme Breaking Ball, along with her sisters Maureen, Deirdre and Aoife. When the All Star awards scheme was officially recognised, she was short-listed in 2004, 2005, and 2007,

References

Living people
Year of birth missing (living people)
Limerick camogie players